"Fast Life" is the second single, twelfth overall, by Turkish–Belgian singer Hadise from her third studio album Fast Life.

Music video
Hadise shot the video and teamed up with Senol Korkmaz, who also shot the video for My Body. The video is about her fast life, you see her in a deluxe private jet, boat, car and in a helicopter.
The video begins with a shot of an aeroplane in the sky, and ending with hadise wrapping up her concert.

Track listings

Belgian - Single
 "Fast Life" - 2:59

iTunes - Single
 "Fast Life" - 2:59
 "Fast Life (Cutee B Remix)" - 3:09

Release history

2009 singles
Hadise songs
English-language Belgian songs
2009 songs
EMI Records singles
Songs written by Hadise
Songs written by Yves Jongen